Fingal is a rural locality on the Mornington Peninsula in Melbourne, Victoria, Australia, approximately  south of Melbourne's Central Business District, located within the Shire of Mornington Peninsula local government area. Fingal recorded a population of 637 at the 2021 census.

Fingal abuts Bass Strait along Gunnamatta Beach and is located between the suburbs of Rye and St Andrews Beach.

Fingal is home to many family friendly attractions such as the Peninsula Hot Springs, Moonah Links Golf Course. There are great walking tracks along the beaches to explore.

See also
 Shire of Flinders – Fingal was previously within this former local government area.
 List of Melbourne suburbs
 Mornington Peninsula

References

Mornington Peninsula
Coastal towns in Victoria (Australia)